Song Yi is the name of:

Song Yi (Qin dynasty), minister of the rebel Chu kingdom during the Qin Dynasty
Song Yi (field hockey), Chinese field hockey player
Song Yi (actress), Chinese actress